Park miniatúr is a miniature park in Podolie, Slovakia. It displays 32 miniature models of architecture from Slovakia, built at a ratio of 1:25 and 1:50.

The park was established on 25 October 2003. In the final form of park, there will be 80 miniature models.

A small selection of the models:
 Čachtický hrad
 Tematín
 Svätý Kríž
 Nový zámok Banská Štiavnica 
 Červený Kameň

Parks in Slovakia
Miniature parks
Buildings and structures in Trenčín Region
Tourist attractions in Trenčín Region